Full Speed Ahead is an album by the American crossover thrash band D.R.I., released in 1995. It is the band's final studio album. The band's former roadie, Chumly Porter, played bass.

The album was not a commercial success. D.R.I. supported it by touring with Acid Bath.

After the album's release, the band decided that they would no longer record any new music; however, they recorded and released the track "Against Me" in 2003. D.R.I. would not release any material until 2016, with the EP But Wait... There's More!

Critical reception

The Charlotte Observer called the album "teeth-gnashing thrash-core," writing that the "pulverizing, heavy guitar chords collide with rat-tat-tat drumming for World War III." The Arizona Daily Star noted that the album title "is a testament to [D.R.I.'s] unrelenting attack." The Wisconsin State Journal wrote that the band's "still blindly and wantonly cranking out metallic, old-school, hard-core punk rock."

Track listing

Credits
 Kurt Brecht – vocals
 Spike Cassidy – guitars
 Chumly Porter – bass
 Rob Rampy – drums

References

D.R.I. (band) albums
1995 albums